The Bayou Corne sinkhole was created from a collapsed underground salt dome cavern operated by Texas Brine Company and owned by Occidental Petroleum. The sinkhole, located near the community of Bayou Corne in northern Assumption Parish, Louisiana, was discovered on August 3, 2012, and 350 nearby residents were advised to evacuate. Scientists have stated that the evacuation order could last for years.

Background
Bayous such as Bayou Corne were largely settled by the Acadians in the late 1700s, who were attracted to the locations for its economic potential as an alligator and crawfish nesting site.  Beneath much of the state of Louisiana, including these bayous, are salt domes, gigantic deposits left during the formation of the North American continent. These domes vary wildly in scale and depth, some as much as 35,000 feet below the surface and as large as Mount Everest. With such depths and dimensions, these domes are naturally under thousands of pounds per square inch of pressure.

The economic value of salt domes has been exploited for centuries.  Salt mining has been going on in Louisiana since the Antebellum period, and in the 20th century, the government began using these underground salt caverns as storage reservoirs for crude oil.  Where there is a juncture of mining, petroleum engineering, and drilling, care must be taken to maintain stability, so as to prevent a disaster as happened at Lake Peigneur.

 
The Napoleonville Dome lies beneath Assumption Parish, and was characterized by 53 distinct caverns, six of which were operated by Texas Brine. One of these, Oxy3, owned by Occidental Petroleum, was more than a mile below the surface. Oxy3 was less than 100 feet from the nearest oil and gas storage-sheath, a distance that, while unsafe, was not illegal. In 2010, Texas Brine applied for a permit to expand Oxy3. Its subsequent pressure tests were unsatisfactory, yet the company felt that the cavern would be able to  withstand the pressure regardless.

The incident
In June 2012, residents of Bayou Corne began to notice unusual phenomena; the ground was prone to shaking and bubbles began to arise from the water.  The US Geological Survey noted an increase in seismic activity, but could not point to an exact source or cause. The local government sent in experts, who suspected a natural gas pipeline leak, but that assumption proved false.  As the symptoms worsened towards the end of July, Texas Brine officially denied the likelihood of a sinkhole. In reality, the Oxy3 cavern had begun to collapse.

Louisiana Governor Bobby Jindal issued an evacuation order on August 3, 2012 after residents reported smells of crude oil throughout the town. Texas Brine investigated the situation by drilling a relief well and found that the outer wall of the salt dome had collapsed, allowing sediment to pour into the cavern and oil and gas to escape to the surface, causing the shaking and bubbles residents had observed.

Expansion
At first, when the sinkhole appeared, it spanned a hectare (2.5 acres). As of late February 2014, the sinkhole was 26 acres and growing. Texas Brine is still responsible for managing the sinkhole and has burned off 25 million cubic feet of gas in an attempt to deplete the escaping reserves. Areas in the vicinity of Bayou Corne have demonstrated a similar, bubbling-up phenomenon, though as of yet no definite connection has been made between these and the original sinkhole.  Scientists have no conclusive answer to when the evacuation orders—largely dependent on the escaping methane gas—will be lifted, yet 3D seismic surveys completed at the beginning of January 2014 show that the sinkhole's expansion is slowing as it begins to stabilize. Aside from the methane escaping via bubbles to the surface, the sinkhole has a tendency to “burp” up debris. This is how its expansion is patterned. Seismic activity will occur, causing it to eject some debris—both solid matter and oil—which makes room for more to slough into the hole, including dirt and trees.

In 2018 it was reported in the newspaper Houma Today (Gannett Co) that the sinkhole has grown to 34 acres.

Impact
The residents of Bayou Corne, who as of March 2014 have been evacuated for 19 months, have involved themselves in a protracted legal battle with Texas Brine.  From the start of the evacuation, each resident has received checks from Texas Brine for $875 per week.  Some residents receive these checks without having even left the town, in defiance of the evacuation order.  One such resident, Mike Schaff, said of Texas Brine's financial settlement option “They think we’re just a bunch of ignorant coonasses."  Nine months after the evacuation, Governor Jindal threatened to sue Texas Brine unless they offered a buyout option to residents.  Accordingly, Texas Brine offered to deal with the 350 affected residents. As of March 2014, 65 people had accepted some form of buyout. Others have opted to join a class-action lawsuit against Texas Brine which was set to go to trial in 2014.  The ecological effects of these developments on local flora and fauna are yet unstudied, but the sinkhole continues to destroy nearby cypress trees, swallowing them during expansion. The Atlantic’s Tim Murphy has summarized the incident thusly: “Bayou Corne is the biggest ongoing industrial disaster in the United States you haven't heard of.”
One class-action lawsuit led to a proposed $48.1 million settlement in 2014, although some residents felt that the legal fees to be awarded ($12.03 million) were too high a percentage of the total.

In September 2014, Texas Brine requested a permit to discharge wastewater back into the Bayou Corne sinkhole in an effort to fix some of the damage it has caused, which sent former and current residents of the town into a frenzy as a heated debate ensued over whether the company believed to be responsible for severe damage and loss of homes should be given permission to tamper more with an area already considered to be "deeply contaminated," as environmental activist Nara Crowley stated.

In July 2015, Texas Brine began a series of lawsuits against Occidental Petroleum, claiming that an oil well drilled by Occidental Petroleum in 1986 triggered the cavern wall break that led to the creation of the sinkhole. Texas Brine is currently seeking $100 million in damages from Occidental Petroleum over the issue.

In 2018, it was reported that a state district judge ruled that fault was shared among three companies: Texas Brine was 35% at fault, Occidental Chemical was 50% at fault, and Vulcan was 15% at fault. Appeals to the ruling are expected.

See also
 Döda Fallet
 Lake Peigneur
 List of sinkholes of the United States
 Rylands v Fletcher

References

External links 
 Assumption Parish information page
 Governor's Office of Homeland Security and Emergency Preparedness response Bayou Corne incident
 Louisiana Department of Natural Resources – Bayou Corne incident
 Texas Brine Company – Bayou Corne Incident page
 Texas Brine Sinkhole Profile
 Forgotten Bayou documentary film

Sinkholes of the United States
Disasters in Louisiana
Landforms of Assumption Parish, Louisiana
Landforms of Louisiana